The former Charles D. McIver School is a historic school building located in Greensboro, Guilford County, North Carolina.  It designed by architects Starrett & van Vleck in Classical Revival style.  It was built in 1923, and is a long, symmetrical, two-story building faced with dark, wire-cut bricks.  It features a central projecting pavilion that contains the school auditorium. The building was last used as an elementary school in the 1970s. It was used as a school for special needs children until the early 2000s.It was named for Charles Duncan McIver (1860–1906), founder and first president of the institution now known as The University of North Carolina at Greensboro.

It was listed on the National Register of Historic Places in 1992.

References

School buildings on the National Register of Historic Places in North Carolina
Neoclassical architecture in North Carolina
Schools in Greensboro, North Carolina
National Register of Historic Places in Guilford County, North Carolina
School buildings completed in 1923
1923 establishments in North Carolina